Antigraptis is a genus of moths belonging to the subfamily Tortricinae of the family Tortricidae.

Species
Antigraptis hemicrates Meyrick, 1930
Antigraptis trigonia Zhang & Li, 2004

See also
List of Tortricidae genera

References

External links
tortricidae.com

Tortricidae genera
Tortricinae
Taxa named by Edward Meyrick